Hasseltiopsis is a monotypic genus of flowering plants in the family Salicaceae. It consists of one species of trees: Hasseltiopsis dioica, which is native to Central America. Formerly placed in the heterogeneous family Flacourtiaceae, Hasseltiopsis is now classified in Salicaceae, along with close relatives Prockia, Pineda, Neosprucea, and Banara.

References

Monotypic Malpighiales genera
Salicaceae
Salicaceae genera